Laurence Cummings (born 1968, Birmingham) is a British harpsichordist, organist, and conductor. He is currently music director of the Academy of Ancient Music.

Biography
Cummings was educated at Solihull School, Christ Church, Oxford and the Royal College of Music.  His teachers have included Jill Severs.  Cummings has played harpsichord and organ continuo with many leading period instrument groups, including Les Arts Florissants, The Sixteen Choir, the Gabrieli Consort and the Orchestra of the Age of Enlightenment.

Cummings was Head of Historical Performance at the Royal Academy of Music from 1997–2012.  He has served as Musical Director of the London Handel Orchestra and the London Handel Festival (since 1999), Musical Director of the Tilford Bach Society, a founding member of the London Handel Players, and a Trustee of the Handel House Museum.  In September 2011, he became the artistic director of the Göttingen International Handel Festival.  He has also conducted at English National Opera and Glyndebourne.  In November 2020, the Academy of Ancient Music announced the appointment of Cummings as its next music director, effective with the 2021–2022 season.  Cummings also serves as music director and principal conductor (maestro titular) of the Orquestra Barroca Casa da Musica, in Porto.

Recordings
Cummings has recorded commercially as both an instrumentalist and a conductor.  His recordings as a conductor have included the first recording of Handel’s newly discovered Gloria with soloist Emma Kirkby and the Royal Academy of Music Baroque Orchestra.  He has also made recordings of keyboard works of Louis and François Couperin, and Handel.

References

External links
 Rayfield Allied: agency biography of Laurence Cummings

1968 births
English harpsichordists
English classical organists
British male organists
English conductors (music)
British male conductors (music)
Academics of the Royal Academy of Music
Alumni of Christ Church, Oxford
Alumni of the Royal College of Music
Living people
Honorary Members of the Royal Academy of Music
British performers of early music
Fellows of the Royal College of Organists
English gay musicians
21st-century British conductors (music)
21st-century organists
21st-century British male musicians
20th-century English LGBT people
21st-century English LGBT people
Male classical organists